Back Street Crawler may refer to:

  Back Street Crawler (album), an album by Paul Kossoff
 Back Street Crawler (band), a group of blues and rock musicians founded by guitarist Paul Kossoff